Brian Baker and Mackenzie McDonald were the defending champions but only McDonald chose to defend his title, partnering Miķelis Lībietis. McDonald lost in the semifinals to Akram El Sallaly and Bernardo Oliveira.

Luke Bambridge and David O'Hare won the title after defeating El Sallaly and Oliveira 6–4, 6–2 in the final.

Seeds

Draw

References
 Main Draw
 Qualifying Draw

Fairfield Challenger - Doubles
Fairfield Challenger